Kuldeep Rai Sharma is an Indian politician. He currently serves as Member of Parliament and All India Congress Committee (AICC) secretary incharge for congress in state of Karnataka. However, in 2021, he was removed from the post of President of Andaman and Nicobar Territorial Congress Committee and was succeeded by Ranglal Haldar. Later on he was promoted by Congress President Sonia Gandhi as All India Congress Committee (AICC) secretary incharge for Indian National Congress in Karnataka. Kuldeep Rai Sharma won the Lok Sabha election 2019 as an Indian National Congress candidate and became Member of Parliament of Andaman & Nicobar Islands constituency, defeating the BJP candidate by a nominal margin of 1,407 votes in his fourth attempt to reach the Parliament.

Results of Past Elections 
In general elections of 2009 Kuldeep Rai Sharma was defeated by BJP MP candidate Bishnu Pada Ray with the difference of 2990 votes. But then also he contested the next 2014 Indian general election from the Andaman and Nicobar Islands (Lok Sabha constituency) and unlike before this time he was defeated by BJP MP candidate Shri. Bishnu Pada Ray with a large margin of 7812 votes.
In the Indian general election, 2019, again he was chosen as a MP candidate of Indian National Congress for the Andaman and Nicobar Islands (Lok Sabha constituency). This time he won the election with a very small margin of 1407 votes from BJP MP candidate Shri. Vishal Jolly.

Awards and recognition 
UNICEF awarded him with PGC Awards 2020 for his work to protect child rights. Kuldeep Rai Sharma in a short time as the Member of Parliament had initiated 18 debates and 15 questions on matters of child labour, malnutrition, mid-day meal schemes, safety of children and child immunization in the Parliament during 2019–2020.

Kuldeep Rai Sharma has been awarded with the prestigious "Sansad Ratna Award 2022”. He has been proactive in the Parliament and has raised various issues with utmost sincerity. The award is based on his cumulative performance in the House from the first sitting of 17th Lok Sabha till the end of Winter Session 2021. He received the award from Hon’ble Chief Election Commissioner of India Shri Sushil Chandra in presence of Shri Arjun Ram Meghwal, Hon’ble MoS, Parliamentary Affairs.

References

Indian National Congress politicians
United Progressive Alliance candidates in the 2014 Indian general election
Living people
1967 births
People from the Andaman and Nicobar Islands
India MPs 2019–present